Iskandariah Bridge or Sultan Iskandar Bridge is one of four major bridges in Kuala Kangsar, Perak, Malaysia with the other one being the Sultan Abdul Jalil Shah Bridge (Sayong Bridge). The 308 metre bridge crosses the Perak River near the town and is made out of steel. 

The bridge remains as the longest steel arch bridge in Malaysia. Traffic on the bridge, however, was greatly reduced when the Sultan Abdul Jalil Shah Bridge (Sayong Bridge) a little further downstream was opened to traffic in 2003 in conjunction with the completion of the North–South Expressway

History
Constructed in 1932 to replace the Enggor ponton bridge which was washed away during the big flood in December 1931, the Iskandariah Bridge has 7 steel arches mounted on concrete piers with a maximum span of 45.11 metres. Its total length is 308 metres and it has an overall width of 10.2 metres. The curb-to-curb road width for two-lane traffic is 7.3 metres. Its deck level is about 20 metres above the river. 

The bridge design was done in London, England and the construction works were executed by Messrs James Craig Ltd., a construction company registered in Klang. 

The bridge was officially opened by the late Almarhum Sultan Iskandar of Perak on 29 June 1932.

See also
 Sultan Abdul Jalil Shah Bridge (Sayong Bridge)
 Victoria Bridge (Karai Bridge)
 Sultan Azlan Shah Bridge

Bridges in Perak
Kuala Kangsar District